The Disease EP is the second EP by British metalcore band The Eyes of a Traitor. It was released 16 September 2011 through distribution at live shows while touring the United Kingdom, the EP was limited to 200 copies. On 9 November 2011 the EP was made free by the band.

Track listing

Personnel 
 Jack Delany – vocals
 Matthew Pugh – guitars
 Tim George – guitars
 Jack Moulsdale – bass
 Sam Brennan – drums, percussion

References

2011 EPs
The Eyes of a Traitor albums
Albums produced by Ed Sokolowski